Heino is a village in the province of Overijssel in the Netherlands. It belongs to the municipality of Raalte and it has 7,080 inhabitants (January 2018). The village has a railway station along the railway  Zwolle - Enschede and it can also be reached by the road N35.

Heino was a separate municipality until 2001, when it merged with Raalte to form a new municipality with the name Raalte.

Heino is very touristic village with many estates and country houses. South-west of Heino, just across the railroad and the border to the municipality Olst-Wijhe, stands the castle Nijenhuis. It hosts an important art museum ( Constant Permeke, Van Gogh et al.). Around the castle is a beautiful sculpture garden (Ossip Zadkine et al.).

Every third week of August the village celebrates the 'Pompdagen' (Pumpdays), mentioned after the local Leugenpompe village pump. The highlight of a series of joyful events is the so-called "Daggie Old Heino", including trades and handicraft from the past; markets and folk music. It draws thousands of visitors to Heino.

Climate

References

External links

Municipalities of the Netherlands disestablished in 2001
Populated places in Overijssel
Former municipalities of Overijssel
Raalte